Cenci or variant Censi  is an Italian surname.

Notable people with the name include:

Cenci
 , a noble family of Renaissance Rome, including:
 Beatrice Cenci (1577–1599), Italian noblewoman and parricide
  (1676–1740), Italian cardinal
 The Cenci, Percy Shelley's drama based on Beatrice's murder of her father
 Les Cenci, Antonin Artaud's drama
 Beatrice Cenci, Berthold Goldschmidt's opera
 The Cenci, Havergal Brian's opera
 Beatrix Cenci, Alberto Ginastera's opera
 Athina Cenci (. 1946), Greco-Italian actress and comedian
 Cecilia Cenci (1942–2014), Argentinian actress
 Gaspare Cenci, Catholic prelate, Bishop of Melfi e Rapolla
 John Cenci (born 1934), former American football player 
 Massimo Cenci (born 1967), politician of San Marino
 Matías Cenci (born 1978), Argentine former football player

Censi
 Andrea Censi, a mathematician
 Censi and Pirota, a sugar company
 Cristiano Censi, an actor
 Giorgio Censi, an actor
 Giuseppe Censi, an actor
 Ludovico Censi, an Italian diplomat
 Marc Censi, a French politician
 Nick Censi, an American record producer
 Ugo De Censi, an Italo-Peruvian priest
 Yves Censi, a French politician

See also
 Cenci Journalism Project, which aims to use multilingual and global sources in Chinese journalism

Surnames of Italian origin